Ciaran Hope (born 4 August 1974) is an Irish composer of orchestral, choral, and film music. He is the composer of Hollywood film soundtracks such as Screw Cupid, Truth About Kerry as well as the contemplative soundtrack for The Letters, based on the life of Mother Teresa of Calcutta. He has also worked extensively in contemporary music since graduating from Trinity College Dublin. He has written a violin concerto for Cora Venus Lunny, a clarinet quartet for the Czech Clarinet Quartet, and his vocal works have been performed internationally by choirs such as Pfizerphonics and Ireland's 2016 choir of the year, Voci Nuove.

Life and career
Growing up in the Meath village of Dunboyne, Hope was involved with music from early childhood: his mother Kitty played the violin and viola as well as teaching in the DIT College of Music (Chatham Row) and his sister Grainne is a professional cellist. He studied music from a young age and developed a keen interest in clarinet and composition during his teenage years. He attended school at Castleknock College before completing B.A. and B.A.I. degrees in Mathematics and Engineering at Trinity College Dublin. Hope continued his composition studies under the supervision of Ladislav Kubik at the Czech American Summer Music Institute in the Prague Conservatory throughout his college years. He later received a Master's Degree in Engineering and Music from Trinity College Dublin in 1998. After winning the IMRO Prize for composition at the RTÉ Musician of the Future competition for his solo clarinet piece Diptych, he moved to Los Angeles to attend the UCLA Film Scoring Program on a Fulbright Scholarship. In 1999, he worked as part of the orchestrating team on the score of the Hollywood feature film The Insider, which was nominated for a Golden Globe Award.

In 2012, his scores for Truth About Kerry (2010) and End of the Innocents (2011) were both nominated for a Gold Medal for Excellence in their respective categories at the Park City Film Music Festival. In 2012 he also provided string arrangements for Irish band Senakah's album Human Relations which was produced by Cranberries guitarist and songwriter Noel Hogan, and recorded in 27 days in the former Bishop's Palace in Limerick.

Having undertaken composer residencies at the Tyrone Guthrie artist's retreat in County Monaghan and the Cill Rialaig artist's retreat in County Kerry with the support of a 2011 Tyrone Guthrie Centre regional bursary award and a 2012 Cill Rialaig residency award, Hope spent four months as the 2013 Composer-in-residence at the Centre Culturel Irlandais in Paris, where he worked on several pieces including a suite of music for children's orchestras based on a cultural tour of Paris and an opera about revolutionary Robert Emmet's time in France. In 2013 he also began work on the orchestral score for the Hollywood film The Letters based on the life of Mother Teresa of Calcutta. Recorded with the Macedonian Radio Symphony Orchestra in Mother Teresa's home town of Skopje, Macedonia, and with New Dublin Voices choir in her spiritual birthplace of Dublin, Ireland, the score was completed in the summer of 2014 and the film went on release in the US on 4 December 2015. The score has also received many live performances, most notably in the Pantheon in Rome by PfizerPfonics.

According to SonyMusicMasterworks.com and FilmMusicReporter.com, Sony Classical released a soundtrack album for the film in 2016, featuring 23 tracks from Hope's score and the Leona Lewis song "Run". Following the album's release, Hope took a career break to complete an MBA at the prestigious UCD Michael Smurfit Graduate Business School in 2017. In a 2021 Linkedin article about "Creativity and its role in strategic thinking", Hope announced that he had accepted a senior role as Director in Innovation and Experience Design with Ernst & Young.

Personal life
He is married to Irish actress Rebecca O'Mara and is the brother-in-law of actor, Jason O'Mara.

Film credits

Composer

Sound department

Music Department

References

External links
 Official Website
 
 Interview with Ciaran Hope about his score for The Letters

1974 births
Living people
Irish composers
Irish film score composers